The Ministry of Universities is a ministerial department in the Government of Spain responsible for proposing and carrying out the government policy on universities as well as representing Spain in the European Union and other international organizations regarding universities.

As of 2018–19, 215,160 people worked at the Spanish universities. From those, 125,471 were university professors and researchers (PDI), 63,281 administration and services personnel (PAS) and 26,408 research staff employed and technical research support staff (PI). Of the total staff in universities, 183,530 belong to public universities and 31,630 to private universities. In the same period, the total university public spending amounted to € 9.5 billion.

The department was created as part of the Sánchez II Government as a split from the Ministry of Science, Innovation and Universities. It is headed by Joan Subirats.

Organization chart 
The Department of Universities is structured in the following bodies:

 The General Secretariat for Universities
 The Technical Cabinet
The Deputy Directorate-General for University Professors Training and Programming
 The Deputy Directorate-General for Degrees and Planning, Monitoring and Management of University Education
 The Deputy Directorate-General for Student Services and Institutional Relations
The Deputy Directorate-General for Research University Activity
 The Undersecretariat of Universities
 The General Technical Secretariat
The Deputy General Technical Secretariat
The Deputy Directorate-General for Appeals and Relations with the Courts of Justice
The Technical Cabinet
The Deputy Directorate-General for Economic Management, Budget Office and General Affairs
The Deputy Directorate-General for Personnel and Inspection of Services
The Information and Communication Technologies Division

Ministry agencies 

 The University Council.
 The University Policy General Conference.
 The State University Student Council.
 The College of Spain in Paris.
 The Menéndez Pelayo International University.
 The National University of Distance Education.
 The National Agency for Quality Assessment and Accreditation.
 The Spanish Service for the Internationalization of Education.

List of officeholders
Office name:
Ministry of Universities (2020–present)

References

Ministries established in 2020
2020 establishments in Spain
Universities